William Oswald Birrell (2 March 1893 – December 1968) was a Scottish professional footballer who played in the Scottish League for Cowdenbeath and St Bernard's as a centre half.

Personal life 
Birrell served in the Queen's Own Cameron Highlanders during the First World War and later emigrated to Canada, where he worked for Salada tea.

Career statistics

Honours 
Cowdenbeath

 Scottish League Division Two (2): 1913–14, 1914–15
 Scottish League Division Two second-place promotion (1): 1923–24

Inverkeithing United

 Scottish Junior Cup (1): 1912–13

Individual

 Cowdenbeath Hall of Fame

References 

Scottish footballers
Cowdenbeath F.C. players
Scottish Football League players
Date of death missing
1893 births
1968 deaths
Association football wing halves
Footballers from Dunfermline
St Bernard's F.C. players
British Army personnel of World War I
Queen's Own Cameron Highlanders soldiers
Scottish emigrants to Canada
Inverkeithing United F.C. players